Jorge Burgos (born 24 June 1956) is a Chilean lawyer and politician.

He was Defense Minister until May 11, 2015 and Interior Minister until 8 June 2016.

References

External links
 BCN Profile

1956 births
Living people
20th-century Chilean lawyers
University of Chile alumni
Christian Democratic Party (Chile) politicians
Chilean Ministers of the Interior
Chilean Ministers of Defense